Vengeance Is Mine (German: Mein ist die Rache ) is a 1916 German silent crime film directed by Rudolf Meinert and starring Hans Mierendorff, Herr Forstner and Marie von Buelow. It was part of a popular series of films featuring the fictional detective Harry Higgs. It was the first screenplay written by Ewald André Dupont, who later went on to be a leading filmmaker.

Cast
 Hans Mierendorff - Harry Higgs
 Herr Forstner - Graf Löwe
 Marie von Buelow
 Ernst Pittschau
 Erna Flemming
 Alice Ferron
 Stefanie Hantzsch
 Franz Ramharter
 Franz Verdier
 Johannes Müller

References

Bibliography
 Bergfelder, Tim & Bock, Hans-Michael. The Concise Cinegraph: Encyclopedia of German. Berghahn Books, 2009.

External links

1916 films
Films of the German Empire
German silent feature films
German crime films
Films directed by Rudolf Meinert
German black-and-white films
1916 crime films
1910s German films